Kodama may refer to:

 Kodama (spirit), a spirit in Japanese folklore
 Kodama (surname), a Japanese surname
 Kodama (train), a Japanese bullet train service 
 Kodama, Saitama, a town located in Kodama District, Saitama, Japan
 Kodama Station, a train station located in Honjō, Saitama, Japan
 Kodama Simham, a 1990 Telugu film starring Chiranjeevi in the lead role
 Kodama (album), a 2016 album by Alcest